A lounge lizard is a man who frequents social establishments with the intention of seducing a woman with his flattery and deceptive charm. The term is reported to have arisen around 1915 in New York. A 1931 book described them as men "[in] the habit of lounging in different dance resorts from tea time on, on a chance of picking up a few dollars;  or they might be habitués of the place or of an outer room, described as a 'lounge', for the purpose of picking up girls and women.  In Europe, he subsequently evolved into what is now known as the gigolo."

In the 1919 Charlie Chaplin film Sunnyside the term appears as a title card, describing a group of men reading newspapers in a hotel lobby.  In Buster Keaton's 1924 film Sherlock Jr., Keaton plays a projectionist at a movie theater where the movie showing is Hearts & Pearls or The Lounge Lizard's Lost Love. The movie within a movie has a character who is good looking and well dressed who is romantically involved with a wealthy young woman.

See also 
 Leisure Suit Larry in the Land of the Lounge Lizards

References

Pejorative terms for men